Kildare Place National School is a Church of Ireland primary school (a national school) in Rathmines, a suburb of Dublin, Ireland. The school is linked to the training college of the Church of Ireland College of Education. Originally founded in the 19th century, and formerly located on Kildare Street in Dublin's City Centre, the school moved to Upper Rathmines Road in 1969.

Notable alumni
Kevin McLaughlin – Former Leinster and Ireland rugby player
David McMillan – League of Ireland footballer with University College Dublin A.F.C.
Evan McMillan – League of Ireland footballer with Sligo Rovers FC
Johnny Sexton – Leinster and Ireland rugby player

References

External links

Primary schools in Dublin (city)
Anglican schools in the Republic of Ireland
Educational institutions established in 1819